Daniel Crawford Orr (born 17 May 1978), is an English rugby league coach and former player. He is an assistant coach for the Salford Red Devils.

Background
Orr was born in Castleford, West Yorkshire, England.

Domestic career

Castleford Tigers
Danny Orr played much of his rugby career for the Castleford Tigers, making it into the 2002 Super League Dream Team, before leaving in 2003 to join the Wigan Warriors.

Danny decided to leave Castleford Tigers at the end of 2003's Super League VIII, signing a 4-year deal with the Wigan Warriors. His last match for the club was against the Wigan Warriors in the last league match of 2003's Super League VIII. He said that the decision was "exceptionally difficult" but added: "I wish to make a totally clean break from Castleford and move with my family to the most famous and successful rugby league club in the world."

Wigan Warriors
The Wigan Warriors coach of the time Stuart Raper commented: "Danny is a very good all round player who will be an asset to any side and I am pleased that he has chosen Wigan. He will blend very well into our line-up."

Despite some good performances towards the end of 2006's Super League XI, the Wigan Warriors decided to allow Orr to leave. Some reports suggested Orr did not want to leave the Wigan Warriors but he was sold to Harlequins RL on 12 October 2006.

Harlequins Rugby League
Orr signed a three-year deal with the Harlequins RL starting in 2007 and was replaced at Wigan by Trent Barrett.

Return to Castleford
Orr rejoined his hometown club Castleford Tigers in 2011 after signing a one-year deal. In July 2011, he signed a one-year extension to his deal, keeping him at his hometown club for the 2012 season.

Danny Orr announced on Thursday 26 July 2012 that he would retire at the end of the Super League season to take up a coaching job with Castleford Tigers, thus ending his 16-year professional career.

Representative career
During his period at the Castleford Tigers he gained many representative honours. In 1997, he was a member of the Great Britain Academy side coached by Mike Gregory, an acquaintance he was to re-establish after joining Wigan. He has gained senior representative experience as well, captaining Yorkshire to victory in the 2003 Origin match. He has played for England and also for Great Britain in the 2002 series against New Zealand.

Coaching career
Orr was assistant coach of Castleford from 2013 to 2020. He had a short period as interim head coach in 2013 following the departure of Ian Millward.

References

External links

(archived by web.archive.org) Harlequins RL profile
Statistics at wigan.rlfans.com
(archived by web.archive.org) Danny Orr (image)
(archived by web.archive.org) Engage Super League profile
(archived by web.archive.org) Profile atthecastlefordtigers.co.uk
(archived by web.archive.org) England battle to French wins

1978 births
Living people
Castleford Tigers coaches
Castleford Tigers captains
Castleford Tigers players
England Knights national rugby league team players
England national rugby league team players
English rugby league players
Great Britain national rugby league team players
London Broncos players
Rugby league five-eighths
Rugby league halfbacks
Rugby league hookers
Rugby league players from Castleford
Wigan Warriors players
Yorkshire rugby league team players